Nebraska is an unincorporated community in Campbell Township, Jennings County, Indiana.

History
Nebraska was platted in 1856, and was likely named for the Nebraska Territory, a hot political topic of the day. The Nebraska post office was discontinued in 2002.

Geography

References

Unincorporated communities in Jennings County, Indiana
Unincorporated communities in Indiana